William K. "Uncle Billy" Martin (1867 – July 10, 1949) was an American football and baseball coach. He was the third head football coach at Wabash College in Crawfordsville, Indiana, serving for one season, in 1887 season, and compiling a record of 0–1.  Martin was also the head baseball coach at Wabash from 1889 to 1892, tallying a mark of 19–10.  Martin died on July 10, 1949, at his home in Crawfordsville.

Head coaching record

Football

References

External links
 

1867 births
1949 deaths
19th-century players of American football
American football quarterbacks
Wabash Little Giants baseball coaches
Wabash Little Giants football coaches
Wabash Little Giants football players